The Puerto Rico Manufacturers Association (PRMA)  is a private, non-profit, and voluntary trade association in Puerto Rico formed with the intent of joining the manufacturing and service industries of Puerto Rico in the same organization. The Association was established in 1928 before Operation Bootstrap and was the entity that suggested the creation of the Puerto Rico Industrial Development Company (PRIDCO).

History
The PRMA was established in 1928 but it didn't incorporate until June 26, 1931. In 1939 it suggested the creation of the Puerto Rico Industrial Development Company (PRIDCO) to promote the economic development of Puerto Rico.

In 1973, the association adopted a format that allows manufacturers to talk directly with different government representatives through a caucus.

Today, the association remains one of the most prominent trade associations in Puerto Rico as it is the largest association that groups manufacturers on the island.

Presidents

Executive Directors

Notes

References

External links
  

1928 establishments in Puerto Rico
Manufacturing in Puerto Rico
Organizations established in 1928